Assistant warrant officer is a rank in the Pakistan Air Force above chief technician and below warrant officer. It is equivalent to the Pakistan Army's naib subedar and the Pakistan Navy's  chief petty officer.

Pakistan Air Force ranks